This list of telephone switches is a compilation of telephone switches used in the public switched telephone network (PSTN) or in large enterprises.

American Digital Switching
 Centura 2000

Alcatel
This lists Alcatel switches before the merger with Lucent Technologies.
 1000 E10 / S12 (during the 1990s the E10 and S12 systems were converted  into a single product line)
 E10 versions:
 E10A (E10N3)- Original switch introduced in 1972 one of the earliest deployments of TDM switching in the world.
 E10B (E10N1)- Major revision in the 1980s which eventually saw ISDN capabilities. Common in France, Ireland, China, India and elsewhere.
 E10B3 - major revision in the 1990s. Common in France & Ireland
 OCB-283 - Another name for more modern versions of E10B and often the name used in India to distinguish it from older versions.
 E10-MT formerly Thomson MT-25 found mostly in France, and MT20 too.
 E10-Five E10B adapted for the North American environment as a class-5 switch.
 E10S satellite switching unit.
 E10-MSC mobile switching center for GSM and other protocols.
 1000 (MM) E10 - Evolved switch for multimedia / broadband and IP network environments. Provides POTS/ISDN and next generation services.
 S12 - Formerly known as "System 12" or the ITT 1240 or acquired by Alcatel when it purchased ITT's assets in Europe. This is a very widely deployed switching system found in Italy, Germany, Belgium, Australia and many other countries around the world. There are a large number of versions of this type of switch ranging from local, to transit to international gateway to mobile switching centers. The line was converted  with the E10 family of exchanges.
 OmniPCX Office
 OmniPCX Enterprise

Thomson
 MT-20
 MT-25
 MT-35

Automatic Electric Co.
Automatic Electric started producing electromechanical switching systems in the 19th century.
 32A42
 32A44
 35E97
 370A
 370B
 375A
 375B
 385A
 385B
 C1-EAX
 CXP5
 CXP5A
 EAX #1
 EAX #2
 EAX #3
 ESU 3072 Line
 FW1 (Four Wire 1 Toll Switch)
 GTD-3 EAX (Toll switch, NOT CCS7 capable)
 GTD-5 EAX (Class 5 switch, many in use today, was the primary switch in former GTE exchanges.  Now supported by Lucent.)
GTD-120 Digital PABX
GTD-1000 Digital PABX
GTD-4600 Digital PABX
OMNI-S1 Digital PABX
OMNI-S2 Digital PABX
OMNI-S3 Digital PABX
 Strowger Automatic Toll Ticketing (SATT); relay and type 45 rotary switch mechanics
 Strowger Step-by-Step (Strowger patents were exclusively licensed to the Automatic Electric Company). 
 TSPS (Traffic Service Position System, obsolete system for operator handled LD calls.)
XPT No. 1
 101 Director
 OXO
 OXE

Avaya
 Currently Available Avaya Switches
 Application Server 5300 (AS5300)
 Communication Manager
 S8800
 S8730
 S8510
 S8400
 S8300D
 INDeX
 IP Office 500v2
 Discontinued Avaya Switches
 1A2 Key System (Electro-mechanical Key System made by Western Electric)
 DEFINITY BCS (Business Communications System)
 DEFINITY ECS (Enterprise Communications Server)
 DEFINITY G3R (RISC processor)
 DEFINITY Communications System Generic 2 (Formerly, System 85)
 DEFINITY Communications System Generic 3 (Formerly System 75)
 DIMENSION (Previously made by AT&T)
 G3MCC (Multi-Carrier Cabinet)
 HORIZON (Previously made by AT&T)
 MERLIN ("Classic"; 206, 410, 820.  Originally made by AT&T)
 MERLIN PLUS ("Classic", Originally made by AT&T)
 MERLIN II ("Classic", Originally made by AT&T)
 MERLIN LEGEND
 MERLIN MAGIX, Integrated Communications System
 PARTNER
 PARTNER II
 PARTNER PLUS
 PARTNER ACS (Advanced Communications System), Replaced by IP Office 500 Partner Mode/Edition
 PARTNER Small Office Edition
 S8700 & S8720
 S8500
 S8300 a, b & c
 SPIRIT
 System 25 (Previously made by AT&T)
 System 75 (Previously made by AT&T)
 System 75 XE (Previously made by AT&T)
 System 85 (Previously made by AT&T)
 IP Office 400 (SOE, 403, 406, 406v2, 412), Replaced by IP Office 500

BPL Telecom
 Sigma Indx-100
 Sigma Indx-150
 Sigma Indx-250
 Sigma Indx-2000

GPO/PO/British Telecommunications
 TXS
 IAX5 Island Automatic eXchange No 5
 SAX Small Automatic eXchange
 UAX5
 UAX6
 UAX7
 UAX8
 UAX9
 UAX10
 UAX11
 UAX12
 UAX13
 UAX14
 UXE7
 UXE8
 TXK1
 TXK5 (Ericsson ARM200)
 TXK6 (Ericsson AKE)
 TXE1
 TXE2
 TXE3
 TXE4
 TXE4A
 TXE4E
 TXE5
 TXE6
 System X
 System Y (Ericsson AXE)
 UXD5

C-DOT
 AN RAX
 MAX
 RAX
 TAX

CopperCom
 CSX 1100
 CSX 2100

Coral Telecom Ltd
 IRIS IVDX Cloud
 IRIS IVDX
 IRIS Lite
 IRIS NGX
 DX-2000
 SBDX

Datang Telecom
 SP30

DGT
 DGT3450

Daewoo
 DTS-1100
 DTS-3100
 DTS-4000

Dialexia
 Dial Gate VoIP Softswitch

DIAX
 Dikon ISDN switch

DSC Communications Corp.
DSC merged with Alcatel-Lucent
 DEX 200
 DEX 400
 DEX 600
 DEX 600E
 DEX 600SC

Electronics and Telecommunications Research Institute (Korea)
The TDX switch was a joint project with Korea Telecom and four manufacturers, LG Electronics, Samsung Telecommunications, Daewoo Telecom and Hanwha Telecom.
 TDX-1
 TDX-10
 TDX-100

Ericsson
 AGF
 AKE
 AR10
 ARB (telex)
 ARE11
 ARE13
 ARF10
 ARF101
 ARF102
 ARK-D (decadic signalling)
 ARK-M (mfc signalling)
 ARK523 (small minor switching centre)
 ARM20
 ARM50
 ARM 201
 ARM202
 ATE
 ATE-NB
 ATE-VB
 AXE (spc electronic 1976)
 AXE 10
 AXE 10 Remote
 AXE Local 7
 AXE Transgate
 AXE810
 Business Phone
 Business Phone Compact
 Business Phone 50
 Business Phone 128i
 Business Phone 250
 CP-400 (crossbar)
 CPP (Media Gateway)
 MD110
 MX-ONE
 MX-ONE Telephony Switch (TSW)
 MX-ONE Telephony Server (TS)
 Rurax

Excel Switching
 EXS 1000
 EXS 2000
 EXS 4000
 EXS 8000
 EXS 16000
 EXS 30000
 LNX 1000

Fujitsu
 C140
 C460
 Focus I
 Focus II
 Focus III
 Focus 50
 Focus 100
 Focus 196
 Focus 960
 Focus Elite
 FETEX 100
 FETEX 150
 FETEX 150 Local
 FETEX 150 Toll
 Essence 630
 Essence 650
 9600 Series (Branded in Australia as Telecom 9600 series)
 9600VS
 9600S
 9600M
 9600L
 Coral (branded as Fujitsu in Australia/New Zealand 1996–2002, manufactured by Tadiran Telecom)
 Coral FlexiCom 200 (formerly Coral SL, discontinued)
 Coral FlexiCom 300 (formerly Coral I, discontinued)
 Coral FlexiCom 400 (formerly Coral II)
 Coral FlexiCom 5000 (formerly Coral III)
 Coral FlexiCom 6000 (formerly Coral III)
 Coral IPx Office
 Coral IPx 500
 Coral IPx 800
 Coral IPx 3000
 Coral IPx 4000

Great Dragon Telecom (GDT)
 HJD04

GEC
GEC later became Marconi (Britain)
 SE50 (4000-type in GPO naming)

Hasler 
List of the mainly electro mechanical switching systems from Hasler AG Bern, which were used in public telephone network in Switzerland for many decades. Hasler AG finally merged into Ascom in 1987.

 HS 25   (modified from the Ericsson OL-100 system with double relays and 25-point selector (Ericsson license), mainly used for small villages and towns in the counties)
 HS 31   (new developed register system, introduced in 1931, based on a new flat type relay and a 100-point two-motion selector, suitable for small and large exchanges)
 HS 52   (new developed register system, introduced in 1953, based on a new 120-point selector, which was in fact a 4 x 30-point uniselector with 2 x 4 brushes offset by 180°, no zero position)
 HS 52 A  (new variant of HS 52 from 1973 with an almost full-electronic register evaluation unit called 'Umrechner', not processor based but centralized programmable by diode matrices)
 HS 52 B  (Processor controlled multiregister system with identifier, but the relay and selector based coupling stage was maintained from the original HS 52 system)
 HS 68     (prototype of a semi-electronic switching system, based on adhesive reed-relays in the coupling stage. One sample system built but not pursued because of the arising PTT IFS-project)
 AXE-10  (digital switching system from Ericsson, initially built and adapted for the Swiss market by Ascom Hasler under Ericsson license)

The last HS 52 A and B exchanges were in operation until the end of 1997. The personnel-intensive electro mechanical systems were shut down prematurely then, due to the imminent opening of the telecoms market in Switzerland. The last AXE-10 local subscriber were migrated to VoIP in June 2020.

Hitachi
 EX10
 HDX-10 
 DX
 DX30
 DX40
 MDX
 HCX5000

Huawei
 C&C08

Hyundai Electronics Industries
 HDX-300
 HDX-2000

Indian Telephone Industries Limited
 ESAX 200
 ILT-512
 ILT-2048
 MILT-64

Inventel
 ACT6000

Iskratel
 SI2000
 SI3000

Italtel
 CT1
 CT2
 CIMA
 UT10
 UT20
 TN16
 UT100
 iMSS (Italtel Multi Service Solution), a.k.a. i-SSW
 i-VLS (Italtel Virtual Lite Switch)
 i-MCS (Italtel Multimedia Communications Suite) - NGN Class 4 and Class 5 SoftSwitch + IMS Core + TAS for delivery of POTS/ISDN/SIP services over legacy and IP Broadband access type networks
 i-RPS (Italtel Routing Policy Server) - Centralized Routing Platform for IP Convergent Networks

ITEC 

 EMS-1 (The ITEC Electronic Modular Switch is an electronic direct control switching system. The modules are combined to form a complete switch or any of the modules can be added to your present Step-by-Step Systems.)
 EMS-2 (The EMS-2 RURAL SWITCH is a stored program control analog switch designed to be cost-effective in small exchanges. The modular design with connectorized cabling permits fast initial installation and growth. The system requires minimum maintenance and is particularly suitable for unattended exchanges. The EMS-2 distributed control design prevents total switch failure which could isolate a remote community.)
 IDS (Integrated Digital System)

ITT Corporation (Includes ITT-Kellogg)
 1210 (originally North Electric DSS)
 1240
 TCS5
 TCS2
 TE500A
 TE400H
 TE400
 TD100
 Kellex
 7J
 7X2
 7X3
 7XB
 A1
 A1-SPC
 CRX
 CSX
 K60 (ITT-Kellogg)
 K7 (ITT-Kellogg)
 K1040
 PC32B
 Relaymatic (ITT-Kellogg)
 TCS5
 TRS4
 AN/TTC-22 100 Line Automatic/Manual Military Tactical Switch (retired)

ITT (Europe)
 7A, 7A1, 7A2, 7E (Rotary 'machine switching' system) driving system
 7D (Rotary, for smaller/rural areas)
 7B, 7B1 (Rotary, French adaptation)
 6, 6N1, 6N2 (Rotary, French adaptation) step by step. Original R6 have not register 
 Pentaconta (crossbar)
 Metaconta (SPC electronic)

JS Telecom
(Later Bosch Telecom)
 JISCOS 8005
 JISCOS 8007

KAREL
 MS38
 IPG Communication Platform
 IPG1000/500
 MS48C/128
 DS200
 IPS/400

Kvant-Intercom
 Kvant (Квант)
 Kvant-E (Квант-Е)

KD
 XE30

Leich
 All Relay (TPS, or terminal per station)
 CS100
 CS200
 CX 2
 CX 6
 CX 90
 LXP-2
 LXP-3
 LXP-4

LG Electronics
 STAREX-TX1
 STAREX-VK (VKX Ltd, Vietnam)

LONIIS
 ATSC 90

Marconi (was GEC)
 System X

Metaswitch
 VP2510
 VP3510
 CA9020
 MG2510
 MG3510

Mitel

TDM/Digital switches
 SX5
 SX10
 SX20
 SX50
 SX100
 SX200 D
 SX200 Light
 SX200 ML/EL/ELx
 SX2000 SG
 SX2000 S
 SX2000 Light
 GX5000L
 GX5000S

Hybrid or IP-only switches
 5000 Communications Platform (formerly Inter-tel 5000 CP)
 SX200 ICP
 3100 ICP
 3300 ICP or Mitel Communications Director (MCD) MiVoice Business

Motorola
These are Mobile Telephone Switching Office Cellular switches
 EMX2500
 EMX4
 EMX5000

NEC
 Aspire
 Topaz
 C410
 C460
 NC10
 NC23
 NC100
 NC23SE
 NC230
 NC400
 NC460
 NA820
 NCA20
 NCX23
 ND10A
 ND10B
 ND20A
 ND20B
 ND20S
 NEAX-61 (K, L, M & S)
 NEAX-61E
 NEAX-61E Remote
 NESXS (Nippon Electric step-by-step based on license from Western Electric)
 M100
 NEAX31 (Discrete Electronic CPU, 4-stage Crossbar switching fabric, PBX)
 NEAX12 (Analog / Digital Hybrid PBX)
 NEAX22 (Analog / Digital hybrid PBX)
 NEAX 2000/1000
 NEAX2400 (Fully Digital PBX)
 XN120
 NEC Univerge SL1000 (Small or Medium Sized, VoIP And TDM)
 Enterprise IP Systems
 NEC Univerge SV7000 (Fully IP, VoIP and TDM) Pure IP Communication server
 NEC Univerge SV8100 (Fully IP, VoIP and TDM)
 NEC Univerge SV9100 (Fully IP, VoIP and TDM)
 NEC Univerge SV8300 (Fully IP, VoIP and TDM) Pure IP Communication server
 NEC Univerge SV8500 (Fully IP, VoIP and TDM) Pure IP Communication server
 NEC Univerge SV9500 (Fully IP, VoIP and TDM) Pure IP Communication server
 NEC Univerge 3C     Pure IP Communication server

Nika (Ukraine)
 ATSK50/200
 ATSK100/2000

Nokia
 DX 200
 DX 220
 DX 220 Compact
 IPA 2800

North Electric (Galion, Ohio)
 CX "All-Relay Exchanges:
(CX evolved from the "Automanual" system designed by Edward Clements: "Clement eXchange" or "Community eXchange")
 CX30 (30 line)
 CX60 (60 line)
 CX100 (100 line)
 CX200 ("broadspan" up to 200 lines)
 CX1000 (large CX expandable to 10,000 lines)
MCX   A version of the CX product line designed by F.R. McBerty after leaving Western Electric/Bell Labs and becoming President of North Electric.
The McBerty design used an early "wire spring relay" and welded piano wire interconnections rather than complex wire multiples. The system never achieved the reputation of the CX product due to problems with poor contact pressure in the interconnection relays.  Despite its much lower cost of production and installation, the level of maintenance required to keep these systems on good order doomed this variation of the CX design.
 DSS1 (North's first digital switch for local exchanges)
This later was renamed the ITT 1210 product upon purchase of North electric by ITT.
 DSS2
 ETS4 (Large #4A-ETS class toll switch based on Ericsson "code switch")
 NTS4E (4-wire toll switch with Xbar switches and "Omni" processors)
 NX1 (Family NX1A, B, C & D; All based on Ericsson By-Path Crossbar license)
L.M. Ericsson purchased North Electric in the early 1950s and brought this Swedish design to North where it was reworked to conform to U.S. telecommunications requirements.
 NX1D (Final production version)
 NX1E (NX-1D with OMNI Processor for line/directory, trunk and number-group translation services)
The NX-1E was not a SPC switch, rather it was a conventional path controlled switching matrix with electronic processors (computers) replacing the control, route selection and translation (directory number to line ID) functions.
 NX2 (Family Small 90–1800 line CDO Xbar)
 NX2 (Original design 1959–1960)
 NX2A (Improved cabinets ~1962)
 UN2 Electrically and mechanically the same as the NX-2A but with design modifications specified by United Telecom (United Telecom/Sprint/Embarq) when they acquired North from L.M. Ericsson in the early 1960s. The "United" version of NX-2A replaced the intercabling connection blocks with wire wrap connections so that switches could be installed or expanded without having custom cable harnesses provided by North Electric.
 Switcher Family (NX-2A pre-installed in a trailer for rapid installation or portable/emergency use)
 TSW Basic Unit with growth to ~360 lines
 TSW2 Expanded unit with growth to ~1200 lines
 TSW3 Jumbo unit with growth to system recommended maximums
 TSD (toll switch)
 AN/TTC-20 568 Line Military Fixed Switch (Used by US Air Force - only one was known in existence at Sembach AB, Germany) (retired)
 AN/TTC-30 568 Line Military Tactical Mobile Switch (Used by US Army and Air Force) (retired)

Nortel
 Application Server 5300 (AS5300)
 Business Communications Manager (BCM)
 BCM50
 BCM200
 BCM400
 BCM450
Nortel Norstar Key Systems
 308
 616
 824 Modular
 Norstar CICS (Compact Integrated Communication System)
 Norstar MICS (Modular Integrated Communication System)
Nortel Meridian 1 PBX
 Option 11/11E/11C
 Option 21/21C
 Option 51/51C
 Option 61/61C
 Option 81/81C
 Communication Servers (CS Systems)
 CS1000 (22,500 lines 3200 trunks TDM and VoIP)
 CS1500 (48,000 lines  8,400 trunks TDM and VoIP)
 CS2000 Compact
 CS2000 (180,000 lines 200,000 trunks TDM and VoIP)
 CS2100 (230,000 ports, 125,000 IP phones, 150,000 analog telephones, 125,000 digital telephones, 200,000 IP trunks, 50,025 digital trunks, 32,000 analog trunks, 200,000 SS7 trunks, 4,093 H.323 gateways, 112,000 nodes per host, 99,999 ACD agents)
 Digital Multiplex System (DMS)
 DMS-10 Carrier Class Switching System (320 ISDN PRI links or more than 20,000 lines) (First "production" class 5 digital switch installed in the North American public telephone network)
 DMS-10 RLCM (640 line remote)
 DMS-10 RSLE (520 line remote)
 DMS-10 RSLM (640 line remote)
 DMS-10S (super small DMS-10 for very small exchanges, less than 640 lines)
 DMS-10M (prepackaged DMS-10, a Community Dial Office in a pre-packaged container/"box")
 DMS-100 FAMILY of Digital Exchanges
 DMS-100 (large local digital Class 5) (also known as an SL-100 when used as CPE (Customer Provided Equipment or PBX service)also known as Centrex.
 DMS-100/200 (local/toll digital more than 135,000 lines)
 DMS-200 (toll digital)
 DMS-250 (Equal Access Carrier Switch-digital)
 DMS-300 (International Gateway Switch-digital)
 DMS-300/250 (combination Carrier/International Gateway 70,000 to 100,000 trunks)
 DMS-500 (Local/Toll + CLEC Switch)
 DMS-Global Services Platform
 DMS-MTX (Cellular MTSO)
 Stored Program (SP) (Electronic Stored Program Control using mini-bar switches)
 SP1 2-Wire (Local)
  The SP1 processor was constructed using Small Scale Integration (SSI) Diode Transistor (DTL) Logic.  Two types of memory was used. Processor read/write scratch memory (called CALL STORE) was implemented using a magnetic core variant called Ferrite Sheet.  Program and Data Store (used to store Software and infrequently changed data) was implemented using a technology called piggy back twistor - in modern parlance a write once, read many times non-volatile memory system).  As was the case with the #1ESS systems, processors and memory were duplicated with automatic comparison of processing results and automatic recovery in the event that a mismatch was discovered.  It did not however support the complex recovery mechanism provided in the #1ESS where a processor from one half of the complex could be connected to a mix of memory (both call store and program store) modules from both halves of the complex in order to achieve a working combination. Processor diagnostics would generally narrow a problem down to a board or three. Connection was made via a crossbar switch.
  A SP1 2-wire variant was also available that provided Centrex services.
  A version of the SP-1 ESS that could provide both 2 & 4 wire services was also built.  The first instance was installed in Vegreville Alberta in 1976 or 1977.
 SP1 4-Wire (Toll)
 The first example of this switch was installed for Bell Canada, in Thunder Bay, Ontario in late 1973.  It provided toll services for North Western Ontario and CAMA (Centralized Message Accounting) for the City of Thunder Bay.  The City of Thunder Bay which operated its own Telephone Company installed a number of 2W SP1s.
 SP1E (used NT40 processor which was later the first processor system for the DMS-100 Family of switches)
 NE-1ESS (Northern Electric version of Western Electric) #1ESS {licensee} 
 Bell Canada operated NE-1ESS 2 wire switches (some of which also provided Centrex services) in Toronto, Ottawa and Montreal.  A 4W NE-1ESS was installed in Thunder Bay to provide telephone switching services (SAGE and AUTOVON)for USA and Canadian bases in that part of North America.  The #1ESS was implemented using discrete diode transistor logic.  A typical circuit board would implement a single 4 input "NAND" gate.  Of the myriad of cards in the system - many were dedicated diagnostic gates.  The diagnostic software had a very high (95% +) success rate identifying a single failing card. The success rate dropped quickly thereafter.  Drifting Voltage Regulator cards caused a lot of angst.
 NE-4A (Northern Electric version of Western Electric) 4A toll {licensee} )
 NE-5XB (Northern Electric version of Western Electric) #5Xbar {licensee} )
 SA1 (Small Northern designed crossbar CDO)
 SA2 (Small Northern designed crossbar CDO)
 SF1 (Small Northern designed crossbar CDO)
 Norstar

Nortel Netaş (Turkey)
 Elif I
 Elif I I
 DRX-4

NTT
 D60
 D70

Oki
 Discovery I PBX
 Discovery II PBX
 Discovery III PBX
 Discovery 8000 PBX
 D10 
 D60 
 D70 
 KB270

Philips
 UR
 UR NB
 UR49
 URVB
 UV
 PRX/A
 PRX/D
 is3000 TDM PBX
 SIP@Net Server Software PBX ( owned by NEC )

ROLM
 CBX (Versions 5,6,7000)
 CBXII (Versions VS, S, M, L 8000–8004, VL 9000–9004)
 9751 CBX (IBM co-design) 9004/9005 versions (Models 10, 20, 40, 50 and multinode 70)
 9751-9006i (Version 1–6; Also called Models 30 and 80); Sold also as Siemens Hicom/HCM300
 Redwood (limited key system)

Spetstroy-Svyaz
 Proton-SSS

Pupin Telecom

 DKTS 20
 DKTS 30

REDCOM Labs
 TRANSip
 SLICE
 HDX
 IGX-A
 IGX-MT
 IGX-N
 MDX 10K
 MDX 384 modular exchange "stackable" to 384 lines/trunks

SAGEM
 Eltex II (Telex)
 Eltex V (Telex)

Samsung Telecommunications
 S-1240
 SDX-100
 SDX-200
 SDX-RB
 TDX-1
 TDX-1B
 TDX-10

Siemens
 SD50 PBX
 SD192MX PBX
 SD232 PBX
 Saturn I PBX
 Saturn II PBX
 Saturn IIE PBX
 Saturn III PBX
Hicom 100
Hicom 150/150E
Hicom 200 (Also sold as the ROLM 9200 CBX)
Hicom 300 (Also sold as the ROLM 9751-9006i CBX)
HiPath 3000
HiPath 4000
HiPath 5000
HiPath 8000
OpenScape SIP
 No. 16 Step-by-Step
 No. 17 Step-by-Step
 No. 51 Step-by-Step
 EDX-P
 EMD55
 EMD56
 EMD57
 ESK - CP24
 ESK - CP44
 ESK - CP44A
 ESK 10000 E
 EWSD
 Remote Switch Unit RSU-DE3
 Remote Switch Unit RSU-DE4
 Remote Switch Unit RSU-DE5
 RCUB-800C
 DCO-CS (Formerly Stromberg Carlson DCO) - Sold to Genband in 2006
 HiQ8000
 SPX2000 (Formerly Equitel)

Sonus
 GSX9000
 GSX4000
 PSX6000
 EMS 12000
 Topcom 601
 Topcom 200
 Hicom 300

Stromberg-Carlson
 DCO 21
 DCO 80
 DCO 200
 DCO 360
 Century DCO6000
 DCO Remote Line Switch 1000 (RLS 1000)
 DCO Remote Line Switch 4000 (RLS 4000)
 RLS 450
 DCO-SE
 DTM
 ESC-1 "Crossreed" electronic exchange
 ESC-3
 MS30
 SC#5 (#5 Crossbar licensed from Northern Electric (Canada) for US sales/distribution)
 Motorswitch - Siemens (Germany)
 XY (Stromberg version of Ericsson "flat motion" switch operated in horizontal planes)

The DCO family starts as generic DCO

 DCO
 DCO-E (Line Switch 10,000 lines)
 DCO-SE (Line Switch 10,000 lines, software enhanced, class features, centrex, etc.)
 DCO-RLS (Remote Line Switch, controlled by hosts above)
 RLS 1000 (Pedestal mount cabinet 1000 lines in a subdivision - required multiple T-1's to host)
 RLS 4000 (Same thing, but 4000 lines)
 RLS (This has the ability in a host outage to make intra-cabinet calls)
 The line switches will also talk to AT&T SLC-96 pedestals – 96 lines on a ped
 DCO-CS (Long-distance, very limited lines – 1+ trunking to long-distance all T-1 cards)

Note:  DCO systems are now supported by GENBAND

Tadiran Telecom
 Coral FlexiCom 200 (formerly Coral SL, discontinued)
 Coral FlexiCom 300 (formerly Coral I, Coral FlexiCom 400 (formerly Coral Idiscontinued)
 I)
 Coral FlexiCom 5000 (formerly Coral III)
 Coral FlexiCom 6000 (formerly Coral III)
 Coral IPx Office
 Coral IPx 500
 Coral IPx 800
 Coral IPx 3000
 Coral IPx 4000
 Coral ICE
 Coral Sea Soft Switch

Telesis IP Santral
 Telesis IP Santral
 Telesis Px24-Mrx 
 Telesis Px24N6 - Telesis Px24N7
 Telesis Px24Mr6 - Telesis Px24Mr7* Telesis Px24Mr6
 Telesis Px24Xr5

Telrad
 TMX-10
 TMX-100

TEMCCO (Iran)
 National Digital Switch (B-NDS)
 TEM X1000
 TEM X256

Tesla

Step-by-Step
 P51 (PSTN switch, modular design expandable from 100 to 10000 lines per exchange)
 UTU (PBX, mechanical components identical to P51, but different signaling)
 USTD (PBX especially designed for Czechoslovak Railways, with 4-wire long-distance stages)

Crossbar switch
 PK 201 (PSTN Switch with R1 register signaling, not widely used)
 PK 202 (PSTN Switch with R2 register signaling, very frequently used in 80's)
 UK 101, UK 102 (PBXes up to 23 and 57 lines)
 UK 111, UK 112 (PBXes of higher capacities, expandable to thousands of lines)

Tekelec
 Tekelec 9000 Distributed Switching Solution (formerly SanteraOne)
 Tekelec 7000 Class 5 Packet Switch (formerly Taqua Open Compact Exchange)

Tropico
 Tropico C (Subscriber Line Digital Concentrator)
 Tropico R (Small Capacity Local/Tandem Exchange)
 Tropico RA (Local/Transit Exchange)

VEB Kombinat Nachrichtenelektronik
 DVZ 2000 (space-division digital switch)
 ENSAD (time-division digital switch)
 OZ 100 D (96-line time-division digital switch)

Veraz Networks
 Control Switch 5.8

VESNET
 DRX-4

Vidar Corporation / TRW Vidar
 IMA2
 ITS 4
 ITS 4/5
 ITS 5

Western Electric / AT&T Technologies / Lucent

Panel
 Local Panel
 Battery cut-off (BCO)
 Ground cut-off (GCO)
 Panel Tandem
 Panel Sender Tandem
 Office Selector Tandem

Step-by-Step / Strowger
 No. 1
 No. 350A
 No. 355A CDO (Community Dial Office)
 No. 356A
 No. 360A

Crossbar switch
 Crossbar Tandem
 No. 1 Crossbar
 No. 3 Crossbar
 No. 3 Crossbar 2-Wire
 No. 3 Crossbar 4-Wire
 No. 4 Crossbar
 No. 4A/CTS Crossbar (Card Translator System)
 No. 4A/ETS Crossbar (Electronic Translator System)
 No. 4M Crossbar
 No. 4M ETS Crossbar
 No. 5 Crossbar
 No. 5 Crossbar 2-Wire
 No. 5 Crossbar 4-Wire
 No. 5 ETS Crossbar
 No. 5A Crossbar

Electronic switching systems / Stored program control

Space division
 Electronic Central Office, the first electronic switching system operating in a trial in Morris, Illinois from November 1960 to January 1962.
 No. 1 ESS (1ESS)
 No. 1 ESS 2-Wire
 No. 1 ESS 4-Wire
 No. 1A ESS
 No. 2 ESS (2ESS)
 No. 2A ESS
 No. 2B ESS
 No. 2C ESS
 No. 3 ESS (3ESS)

Time division multiplexing
 No. 101 ESS, a TDM PBX system installed partly on corporate premises and partly in the central office.
 No. 4 ESS (4ESS)
 No. N 4 ESS (Note N stands for 'New') (4ESS)
 No. 5 ESS (5ESS)
 No. 5 ESS CDX (Compact Digital Exchange)
 No. 5 ESS-2000 VCDX (Very Compact Digital Exchange)
 No. 5 ESS-2000 VCDX Remote
 No. 5A RMS (Remote Switching Module)
 No. 5B RMS (Remote Switching Module)
 No. 5E XC (Extended Capabilities)
 No. 7 R/E (Revolutionary/Evolutionary)
 No. 10A Remote Switching System (10A RSS)

USSR manufacturers
 AMTS-1M
 AMTS-2
 AMTS-3
 Кварц (Quartz)
 M-10C
 ATS-47
 ATS-49
 ATS-54
 ATS-K
 ATS-K4
 ATSK-U

Yeastar 

 S20
 S50
 S100
 S300
 K2
 P550
 P560
 P570

ZTE
 ZX500
 ZXJ10
 ZXJ2000

Other digital switches
 BZ5000 (formerly Batik Elcom 4KT from Batik/Zetax, Brazil)
 iGen 
 PacketStar PSAX1000/1250/2300/4500
 Plexus/Lucent Gateway Platform/Lucent Compact Switch (formerly Telica Plexus 9000)
 Zetax ZTX610

Other experimental or canceled switches
 Lynch LCS
 Mitel CX5000
 Collins Radio Corp. DTS
 Oresis ISIS-700

References